Dzau is a volcanic centre in Georgia (country), Russian-occupied de facto South Ossetia. It is also known as Java volcanic centre. The field is close to the town of Dzau, in the Greater Liakhvi River valley.

The Caucasus has been affected by volcanic activity during the Late Cenozoic in three areas. One of these is the Kazbek area with the Kazbek, Keli Highland and Dzau systems which were active during the Quaternary.

It contains three volcanoes, Tsru also known as Chvriva at  altitude, Sazeleti at  altitude and Bordzhnis or Borgnisi at  altitude. Sazeleti is a lava cone, the other two volcanoes are fissure vents. Remnants of lava flows have also been found.

The volcanic field has erupted principally andesite. Minerals found in the rocks include amphibole, clinopyroxene, orthopyroxene and plagioclase.

The volcanoes are possibly between 200,000 and 100,000 years old.

References

Sources

External links 

Volcanoes of Georgia (country)
Volcanic fields
Pleistocene volcanoes